The Grammy Award for Best Contemporary Song was awarded between 1959 and 1971.  The award had several minor name changes: 

In 1959 the award was known as Best Performance by a "Top 40" Artist  
In 1961 it was awarded as Best Performance by a Pop Single Artist 
From 1962 to 1965 it was awarded as Best Rock & Roll Recording 
In 1966 it was awarded as Contemporary (R&R) Single  
In 1967 it was awarded as Best Contemporary (R&R) Recording  
In 1968 it was awarded as Best Contemporary Single
From 1970 to 1971 it was awarded as Best Contemporary Song

Years reflect the year in which the Grammy Awards were presented, for works released in the previous year.

1970s

1960s

References

Contemporary Song
Lists of award winners
Song awards
Songwriting awards